Oliver Vogt (born 15 July 1977) is a German politician for the CDU.

Life and politics 
Vogt was born in 1977 in the East German town of Neuhaus am Rennweg and became a member of the Bundestag in 2021.

Vogt grew up in Espelkamp, where he graduated from the Söderblom-Gymnasium in 1997. From 1997 to 1998 he did his basic military service in the Navy, serving at the Eckernförde, Flensburg and Glücksburg-Meierwik locations. From 1998 to 2004 he studied physics at the University of Bielefeld, where he graduated as a physicist. He then worked as a research assistant and received his doctorate in 2007. Starting in 2008 he began work as a physics and mathematics high school teacher at the Besselgymnasium Minden.

References 

Living people
People from Bezirk Suhl
1977 births
Christian Democratic Union of Germany politicians
21st-century German politicians
Members of the Bundestag 2021–2025